"We'll Always Have Bourbon Street" is the eighth episode of The Vampire Diaries's fourth season, premiering December 6, 2012 on The CW.

Plot
After Elena and Damon wake up and continue where they left off the night before, Stefan arrives to the Salvatore house and approaches Damon with the suspicion that Elena is sired to him. Stefan tells Damon to ask Elena to try to drink from a blood bag again and see if she can keep it down, since he believes the only reason she can only drink straight from the vein is because Damon told her to. Damon then asks Elena and sees that she can now keep the blood down. Damon decides to help Stefan investigate the sire bond in New Orleans, hoping to find a former flame of Damon's who was also sired to him. Damon and Stefan visit a witch who refuses to tell them anything and claims she is not a practitioner. While the Salvatore brothers are out of town, Elena, Caroline and Bonnie share a girls’ night, but an argument quickly ensues when Caroline starts criticizing Damon. When Caroline gets angry at Elena's stubbornness and how she is so smitten with Damon, Elena reveals that she and Damon slept together, which leads to Caroline telling Elena that she is sired to Damon.

Meanwhile, at Hayley’s urging, Tyler confronts one of Klaus’ hybrids, Kimberly, and the situation quickly escalates into violence when the hybrids start fighting over who takes the pack-leader role. Kimberly then captures Caroline to try to show Tyler that she is the leader, but Tyler and Elena end up saving Caroline, and the other hybrids (including Kimberly) accept Tyler as their leader.

While in New Orleans, Damon recalls some information from the past which figured out the witch was lying to them and went back for a second visit.
The witch tells Damon that the only way to try to break a sire bond is by telling the sired vampire to forget about him or her and move on with his or her life. She also tells them that there is no way to officially break the sire bond. The witch also reveals that a sire bond only happens when the vampire who is sired has feelings for their maker before they turn into a vampire.

Damon realizes he has to do the right thing with Elena and decides to tell her to move on. When he goes to talk to her, Elena realizes that he wants to break things off and tries to convince him that her feelings are real, as she believes they are, and that the sire bond only affects the way she acts. Also in the episode, we find out that Professor Shane is teaching Bonnie a type of magic called "expression," which the witch in New Orleans called a thing that is even more evil than dark magic, and other witches don't even call it magic at all.

Reception

Ratings 
When the episode aired on December 6, 2012, the episode was viewed by 2.42 million American viewers.

References

External links 
Recap from Official Website

2012 American television episodes
The Vampire Diaries (season 4) episodes
Television episodes set in New Orleans